Anton Holenkov; Anton Golenkov (born 17 December 1989) is a Ukrainian (until 2014) and Russian football midfielder. He plays for Sevastopol.

Career
Holenkov is a product of his native Koreiz youth sport school system.

He played in the different Ukrainian amateur and Second League clubs. In 2015, he was promoted to Ukrainian Premier League together with his club FC Oleksandriya. In January 2016 Holenkov signed a contract with the Belarusian Premier League club FC Torpedo-BelAZ Zhodino.

In 2014, after the annexation of Koreiz, Crimea to Russia, received a Russian citizenship.

References

External links
 Profile at FFU Official Site (Ukr)
 
 
 Profile at Crimean Football Union

1989 births
Living people
People from Yalta Municipality
Ukrainian footballers
Association football midfielders
FC Arsenal-Kyivshchyna Bila Tserkva players
FC Feniks-Illichovets Kalinine players
FC Oleksandriya players
FC Metalurh Zaporizhzhia players
MFC Mykolaiv players
Ukrainian expatriate footballers
Ukrainian expatriate sportspeople in Belarus
Expatriate footballers in Belarus
FC Torpedo-BelAZ Zhodino players
Naturalised citizens of Russia
Russian footballers
Crimean Premier League players
FC Sevastopol (Russia) players